Shefford is a federal electoral district in Quebec, Canada, that has been represented in the House of Commons of Canada since 1867. Its population in 2006 was 100,000.

Demographics
Ethnic groups: 99.2% White
Languages: 95.2% French, 3.2% English 
Religions: 90.3% Catholic, 3.8% Protestant, 4.7% No religious affiliation 
Average income: $25,354

Geography

This southern Quebec riding extends from Sherbrooke in the east to Montreal in the west, straddling the Quebec regions of Montérégie and Estrie.

The district includes the central and eastern Rouville Regional County Municipality, all of La Haute-Yamaska (except Bromont) and southwestern Le Val-Saint-François Regional County Municipality. The main communities are Granby, Roxton Pond, Saint-Césaire, Saint-Alphonse, Valcourt, Waterloo, Saint-Paul-d'Abbotsford, Shefford, Granby Township, and Rougemont. The Area is 1,428 km2.

The neighbouring ridings are Brome—Missisquoi, Saint-Jean, Chambly—Borduas, Saint-Hyacinthe—Bagot, Drummond, and Richmond—Arthabaska.

History
The electoral district was created in the British North America Act of 1867.

The 2012 electoral redistribution saw this riding gain a small fraction of territory from Brome—Missisquoi.

Members of Parliament

This riding has elected the following Members of Parliament:

Election results

Note: Conservative vote is compared to the total of the Canadian Alliance vote and Progressive Conservative vote in 2000 election.

Note: Social Credit vote is compared to Ralliement créditiste vote in the 1968 election.

Note: Ralliement créditiste vote is compared to Social Credit vote in the 1963 election.

Note: "National Government" vote is compared to Conservative vote in 1935 election.

See also
 List of Canadian federal electoral districts
 Past Canadian electoral districts

References

Campaign expense data from Elections Canada
Riding history from the Library of Parliament
2011 Results from Elections Canada

Notes

Granby, Quebec
Quebec federal electoral districts